In commutative algebra, a regular sequence is a sequence of elements of a commutative ring which are as independent as possible, in a precise sense. This is the algebraic analogue of the geometric notion of a complete intersection.

Definitions
For a commutative ring R and an R-module M,  an element r in R is called a non-zero-divisor on M  if r m = 0 implies m = 0 for m in M. An  M-regular sequence is a sequence

r1, ..., rd in R

such that ri is a not a zero-divisor on M/(r1, ..., ri-1)M for i = 1, ..., d.  Some authors also require that M/(r1, ..., rd)M is not zero. Intuitively, to say that 
r1, ..., rd is an M-regular sequence means that these elements "cut M down" as much as possible, when we pass successively from M to M/(r1)M, to M/(r1, r2)M, and so on.

An R-regular sequence is called simply a regular sequence. That is, r1, ..., rd is a regular sequence if r1 is a non-zero-divisor in R, r2 is a non-zero-divisor in the ring R/(r1), and so on. In geometric language, if X is an affine scheme and r1, ..., rd is a regular sequence in the ring of regular functions on X, then we say that the closed subscheme {r1=0, ..., rd=0} ⊂ X is a complete intersection subscheme of X.

Being a regular sequence may depend on the order of the elements. For example, x, y(1-x), z(1-x) is a regular sequence in the polynomial ring C[x, y, z], while y(1-x), z(1-x), x is not a regular sequence. But if R is a Noetherian local ring and the elements ri are in the maximal ideal, or if R is a graded ring and the ri are homogeneous of positive degree, then any permutation of a regular sequence is a regular sequence.

Let R be a Noetherian ring, I an ideal in R, and M a finitely generated R-module. The depth of I on M, written depthR(I, M) or just depth(I, M), is the supremum of the lengths of all M-regular sequences of elements of I. When R is a Noetherian local ring and M is a finitely generated R-module, the depth of M, written depthR(M) or just depth(M), means depthR(m, M); that is, it is the supremum of the lengths of all M-regular sequences in the maximal ideal m of R. In particular, the depth of a Noetherian local ring R means the depth of R as a R-module. That is, the depth of R is the maximum length of a regular sequence in the maximal ideal.

For a Noetherian local ring R, the depth of the zero module is ∞, whereas the depth of a nonzero finitely generated R-module M is at most the Krull dimension of M (also called the dimension of the support of M).

Examples

Given an integral domain  any nonzero  gives a regular sequence.
For a prime number p, the local ring Z(p) is the subring of the rational numbers consisting of fractions whose denominator is not a multiple of p. The element p is a non-zero-divisor in Z(p), and the quotient ring of Z(p) by the ideal generated by p is the field Z/(p). Therefore p cannot be extended to a longer regular sequence in the maximal ideal (p), and in fact the local ring Z(p) has depth 1.
For any field k, the elements x1, ..., xn in the polynomial ring A = k[x1, ..., xn] form a regular sequence. It follows that the localization R of A at the maximal ideal m =  (x1, ..., xn) has depth at least n. In fact, R has depth equal to n; that is, there is no regular sequence in the maximal ideal of length greater than n.
More generally, let R be a regular local ring with maximal ideal m. Then any elements r1, ..., rd of m which map to a basis for m/m2 as an R/m-vector space form a regular sequence.

An important case is when the depth of a local ring R is equal to its Krull dimension: R is then said to be Cohen-Macaulay. The three examples shown are all Cohen-Macaulay rings. Similarly, a finitely generated R-module M is said to be Cohen-Macaulay if its depth equals its dimension.

Non-Examples 
A simple non-example of a regular sequence is given by the sequence  of elements in  since

has a non-trivial kernel given by the ideal  . Similar examples can be found by looking at minimal generators for the ideals generated from reducible schemes with multiple components and taking the subscheme of a component, but fattened.

Applications

If r1, ..., rd is a regular sequence in a ring R, then the Koszul complex is an explicit free resolution of R/(r1, ..., rd) as an R-module, of the form:

In the special case where R is the polynomial ring k[r1, ..., rd], this gives a resolution of k as an R-module.

If I is an ideal generated by a regular sequence in a ring R, then the associated graded ring

is isomorphic to the polynomial ring (R/I)[x1, ..., xd]. In geometric terms, it follows that a local complete intersection subscheme Y of any scheme X has a normal bundle which is a vector bundle, even though Y may be singular.

See also
Complete intersection ring
Koszul complex
Depth (ring theory)
Cohen-Macaulay ring

Notes

References 
 
 
 Winfried Bruns; Jürgen Herzog, Cohen-Macaulay rings. Cambridge Studies in Advanced Mathematics, 39. Cambridge University Press, Cambridge, 1993. xii+403 pp.  
 David Eisenbud, Commutative Algebra with a View Toward Algebraic Geometry. Springer Graduate Texts in Mathematics, no. 150.  

Commutative algebra
Dimension